Młody Las is a Polish historical film. It was released in 1934.

Cast
Kazimierz Junosza-Stępowski - Professor Pakotin 
Bogusław Samborski - School Director Nikołaj Iwanowicz Starogrenacki
Maria Bogda - Wanda Lityńska
Adam Brodzisz - Stefan Kiernicki 
Stefan Jaracz - Professor Kiernicki, Jan's father 
Mieczysław Cybulski - Jan Walczak 
Witold Zacharewicz - Antoni Majewski
Tekla Trapszo - Walczakowa, Jan's mother 
Maria Balcerkiewiczówna - Jakubowska, mother of pupil
Michał Znicz - Attenot "Ciapciuś", the French Professor 
Władysław Walter - The One-Armed Security Guard 
Tadeusz Fijewski - Pupil
Jonas Turkow - Student  
Alina Halska - Zofia Strońska
Paweł Owerłło - Professor
Antoni Bednarczyk - Professor
Władysław Surzyński - Von Stolpe, Russian officer 
Helena Sulimowa - Girls' school headmistress
Amelia Rotter-Jarnińska - Majewski, Antoni's mother
Kazimierz Pawlowski - Pupil Franek Pszczółkowski
Wiktor Biegański - Profesor Żewakow 
Władysław Walter - Terteńko, janitor
Józef Orwid - Drunkard
Jan Szymański - Majewski, Antoni's father
Saturnin Żórawski - Jurek, Stefan's brother
Maria Zarembińska - Irka
Stanisław Daniłowicz - Delegate of strike committees at secret meeting
Jerzy Kobusz - Pupil
Leszek Pośpiełowski - Student
Mieczysław Bilażewski - Pupil
Stefan Szczuka - Professor
Józef Małgorzewski - Pupil
Eugeniusz Koszutski
Bronisław Lipski
Aleksander Buczyński

References

External links
 

1934 films
Polish historical drama films
1930s Polish-language films
Polish black-and-white films
1930s historical drama films
1934 drama films